Viladamat is a village of Alt Empordà, 6 kilometers to the north from l'Escala, a municipality in Catalonia, Spain.

References

External links
 Government data pages 

Municipalities in Alt Empordà